Hoplitis is a genus of bees in the family Megachilidae. There are more than 380 described species in Hoplitis.

See also
 List of Hoplitis species

References

Further reading

External links

 

Megachilidae
Bee genera
Articles created by Qbugbot
Taxa named by Johann Christoph Friedrich Klug
Taxa described in 1807